www.pitchshifter.com is the fourth album by the British industrial metal band Pitchshifter, released in 1998. The record, which was their first released through a major label, sold just over 60,000 copies in the US alone—selling nearly twice as much as the group's proceeding album Deviant did (which sold 33,000 copies).

The album's name comes from the band's domain name–a relative novelty at the time of the release. The domain name registration was eventually lapsed; JS Clayden said "we carried the website for such a long time that it felt like a burden being lifted to let it go".

Track listing

Personnel
Pitchshifter
J.S. Clayden - vocals, beats, programming
Mark Clayden - bass, sampler
Jim Davies - guitars
Johnny Carter - guitars, programming

Additional musicians
Keith York - drums, percussion samples
Pablo Yeadon - acoustic guitar on "Disposable"

Production
H. Forbes, Paul Williams, Nick Philip and Unknown Graphic Services - artwork
Johnny Carter and Neil Simmons - engineering
Jodie Zalewski - assistant engineer
Johnny Carter and J.S. Clayden - programming
Bob Ludwig - mastering
Ralph Barklam and Tony Woolliscroft - photography
Machine - production
Clinton Bradley - additional analog synthesizer manipulation
Johnny Carter and JS Clayden - writer

References

Pitchshifter albums
1998 albums
Geffen Records albums
Albums produced by Machine (producer)